Willi Bierofka (born 21 January 1953) is a retired German football defender and later manager.

References

1949 births
Living people
German footballers
TSV 1860 Munich players
Association football defenders
Bundesliga players
2. Bundesliga players
German football managers
TSV 1860 Munich managers
Footballers from Munich